Ambikeshwori Temple (Nepali: अम्बिकेश्वरी  मन्दिर) is the highly religious centre of the attraction of people in the Mid-Western Region of Nepal, South Asia. This temple lies in the lap of largest valley of South-Asia, Dang Valley. Lying just at the eighteen ward of Ghorahi sub-metropolitian city of Dang district , it is accessible to many of the pilgrims.
The temple also known as ‘Maiko Than’ (Mother's Place) is situated to the north of Ghorahi one and half kilometers away on bank of Katuwa Khola. This Shaktipeetha is supposed to have emerged due to the falling of right ear of Satidevi according to the Swasthani Purana. This temple is the most popular Shaktipeeth of Dang.

Every year a great number of people gather during Dashain,"Phulpati"and "Kalratri".

References

External links
 
 

Hindu temples in Lumbini Province